Qazvin-Azadi Airport  is an airport located near Qazvin Province, Iran, near Qarpuzabad village.

References

Airports in Iran
Buildings and structures in Qazvin Province
Transportation in Qazvin Province